Florin Olteanu (born 5 April 1964) is a Romanian bobsledder. He competed in the four man event at the Calgary 1988 Winter Olympics.

References

External links
 

1964 births
Living people
Romanian male bobsledders
Olympic bobsledders of Romania
Bobsledders at the 1988 Winter Olympics
Place of birth missing (living people)